Rob Chapman (born 1964) is a South Australian-born businessman, former CEO of St George Bank and former Chairman of the Adelaide Football Club and Adelaide Airport. He has previously been considered to be one of South Australia's most influential people.

Early years
Chapman was born in 1964 at Mount Barker and educated at Sacred Heart College.

Career
Chapman's early career was spent in the insurance and funds management industry, initially in Adelaide, then in Brisbane, Sydney and Melbourne before returning to Adelaide and taking executive roles in banking. He has held senior appointments at:
Prudential Corporation Australia
Colonial State Bank
Regional General Manager for the Commonwealth Bank of Australia's operations in South Australia, Northern Territory and Western Australia (-2002)
Managing Director of BankSA (2002-2010)
Chief Executive Officer of St. George Bank (2010-2012)

Professional
(former) President of BusinessSA.
(former) President, SA chapter, the Committee for Economic Development of Australia.
Member of the South Australian Economic Development Board.
Chair, UniSA MBA program
 (former) Member of the Premier's Climate Change Council
Chairman of Adelaide Airport Ltd
Non-Executive Chairman of Perks
Member of the South Australian Government’s Economic Development Cabinet Committee
Global Chairman of Investment Attraction SA
Chairman of Barossa Valley Infrastructure Ltd
Chairman of the Adelaide Football Club
Director of Coopers Brewery Pty Ltd.

Adelaide Football Club
Chapman was first appointed chairman of the board of directors of the Adelaide Crows Football Club in December 2008 for 2009. He was reappointed chairman for 2010 and 2011. He stepped down as chairman in October 2020.

Personal

Chapman is married to Lisa. They have four children, two of whom are young adults, a teenage daughter, and a young son.

References

External links
Photo of Chapman, August 2010

Living people
Businesspeople from Adelaide
1964 births
University of South Australia alumni
Adelaide Football Club administrators
Westpac people
People educated at Sacred Heart College, Adelaide